Jess Stonestreet Jackson Jr. (February 18, 1930 – April 21, 2011) was an American billionaire wine entrepreneur, lawyer, racehorse owner, and self-made businessman. He started the Kendall-Jackson wine business with his first wife, Jane Kendall (Wadlow) Jackson. The family's 1974 purchase of an  pear and walnut orchard in Lakeport, California was converted to a vineyard. The first release of Vintner's Reserve Chardonnay in 1982 closed the gap between the super premium and cheap wine market. As of 2010, Vintner's Reserve Chardonnay was one of the most popular wines on the market. His style as a vintner developed into a focus on single-vineyard, mountain grown wines.

Early life and education
Jess Jackson grew up during the Great Depression and was raised in San Francisco's Sunset District. His father, a teacher, was out of work three times while he was growing up, and there were times when the family had to survive on rice. To help support his family, Jackson started working at an early age. From the age of five, when he got his first job as a paper boy, he worked a variety of jobs including candy maker, a soda jerk, a temp at the post office, a hops picker, a longshoreman, a teamster, a lifeguard, an ambulance driver, among other things.

Jackson graduated from San Francisco's Abraham Lincoln High School. He earned a law degree from the University of California, Berkeley. While studying law he simultaneously held down jobs as a dock laborer, Berkeley policeman and an ambulance driver to put himself through school. Upon his graduation from Berkeley in 1951, Jackson started practicing real estate law.

Wine Production
In the late 1950s, Jess Jackson started a law firm in the San Francisco area, specializing in property rights issues, that went on to argue cases in front of the Supreme Court. Jackson was one of the founding members of the American California Trial Lawyers Association. He also pursued other business interests, including being one of the four founding members in the 1970s of Decimus, a company which leased IBM mainframe computers to corporations. 
 
In 1974, Jackson and then wife, Jane Kendall Jackson, purchased an 80-acre pear-and-walnut orchard in Lakeport. He converted it to growing premium Chardonnay and other varietals after realizing that there was increasing demand for high-quality grapes in the area. He sold the property's grapes to local wineries until 1981, when a down market led to a surplus of grapes on the market. Faced with the prospect of selling his grapes for a price that wouldn't cover the costs of growing them, he decided to make his own wine. Instead of following the market by producing low-quality, inexpensive wines, Jackson studied the market and realized that there was a shortage of high-quality wines at affordable prices. He decided to produce wines that would fill that gap, and, two years later, he released the first Kendall-Jackson Vintner's Reserve Chardonnay. That year it became the first wine to ever win a Platinum Award from the American Wine Competition.

Jackson and Kendall divorced in the early 1980s and Jackson later married Barbara Banke. Banke became his lifelong partner and co-manager of their wine businesses.  Jackson and Banke continued to expand their business, eventually owning about 25,000 acres in California, 14,000 of which were planted with wine grapes.

In 1992, Jackson prevailed in a highly contentious lawsuit against his former winemaker Jed Steele that prohibited Steele from revealing the formula  for the Vintner's Reserve Chardonnay. In 1997, Jackson lost a lawsuit against E & J Gallo Winery in which Jackson alleged that Gallo's Turning Leaf label was a ripoff of his Vintner's Reserve.

Among the wineries in his Jackson Family Wines portfolio, as of 2009, are Kendall-Jackson, Murphy-Goode, Robert Pecota Winery, Byron Estates, Edmeades, Matanzas Creek, La Crema, Stonestreet, Arrowood, Lajota, Cardinale, Atalon, Lokoya, Carmel Road, Cambria, Vérité, Archipel, Chateau Potelle, and Freemark Abbey Winery. As of early 2009, it was ranked as the ninth largest winery holding company in the United States. Jackson's brands at the time of his death were producing 5 million cases of wine annually.

In 2005, Jackson was listed by Forbes Magazine as the 366th wealthiest person in the world (tied with many others), with 1.8 billion dollars in assets. The 2010 list by Forbes Magazine placed Jackson as the 536th richest person in the world with 1.9 billion dollars in assets.

Vintner's Hall of Fame
Every year the Culinary Institute of America sponsors the induction of wine industry leaders into the Vintner's Hall of Fame. Nominees are selected by a nominating committee, which creates the list of nominees that is later voted on by group of wine writers, critics, historians, and past inductees. The nominees with the most votes are then inducted into the Vintner's Hall of Fame.

Jess Jackson was inducted into the Vintner's Hall of Fame in 2009 for his outstanding contributions to the wine industry. He was among several other industry luminaries being inducted that year, including winemaker Warren Winiarski, whose Stag's Leap Cabernet Sauvignon won first place over Chateau Mouton Rothschild and Chateau Haut-Brion in the 1976 Judgment of Paris and forever changed the way California wines were viewed worldwide, and the legendary Beringer Brothers, whose award-winning wines helped to establish Napa Valley's reputation as a top grape-growing region.

Vintner's Reserve Chardonnay
Kendall-Jackson Vintner's Reserve Chardonnay debuted in 1982 with a 16,000 case production. In 1983, Vintner's Reserve Chardonnay won first ever Platinum Award from the American Wine Competition. Not coincidentally, American's taste for the Chardonnay picked up at the same time. The wine is characterized as an oaky chardonnay with a slightly more residual sugar.

Kendall-Jackson Vintner's Reserve help Chardonnay become the most popular grape varietal amongst American wine drinkers. Vintner's Reserve Chardonnay is the most popular selling wine made from that varietal, which makes it the most popular wine in America.

Ray Isle of Food and Wine Magazine ranked Vintner's Reserve Chardonnay as one of his "50 Wines You Can Always Trust" in April 2007.

Kendall-Jackson Vintner's Reserve Chardonnay is also a staple in the household of Barack Obama.

Thoroughbred Racing
In 2007, Jackson bought a controlling interest in the champion racehorse Curlin, who won the Preakness Stakes and the Breeders' Cup Classic that year. In 2008, the horse won the $6 million Dubai World Cup.

Jackson won the Sportsman of the Year 2008 Insider Award: "To owner Jess Jackson for believing in the greatness of his beloved Curlin then went above and beyond the call to prove it."

On 6 May 2009, Jackson's Stonestreet Stables, along with Harold T. McCormick, purchased the 2009 Kentucky Oaks winner Rachel Alexandra. On May 16, she won the 2009 Preakness Stakes and was later named 2009 American Horse of the Year. She was bred to Curlin upon her retirement, and the resulting offspring was a colt named Jess's Dream. He won his first race in one of the most talked about performances of the year, but then was retired due to injury.

Jackson's investments in racehorses totaled over $200 million.

Death
Jackson succumbed, after several years of treatment, to melanoma on 21 April 2011.  He was buried in a newly-created 12,000 square-foot cemetery on an Alexander Valley hilltop.

See also 
List of wine personalities

References

External links
 Jess Jackson profile at Kendall-Jackson Estates

1930 births
2011 deaths
20th-century American businesspeople
20th-century American lawyers
American billionaires
American racehorse owners and breeders
American winemakers
Businesspeople from California
People from Lakeport, California
People from Sonoma County, California
UC Berkeley School of Law alumni
University of California, Berkeley alumni